Biharwe is a neighborhood within Mbarara City

Location

Overview
The town is located in Biharwe Division a newly added Division to Mbarara Municipality. It is developing urban area as many investors are seeing it as a potential tourist area after the establishment of Igongo Cultural Centre. It is next to Mburo Game Reserve, Lake Mburo and Lake Nakivale.

Points of interest
 The 1520 eclipse monument 

 The Palace of Kitami kya Nyawera an empress of Songora Kingdom of Mpororo
 Igongo Cultural Centre
 Biharwe F.C.
 Biharwe-Bwizibwera unpaved road which is yet to be tarmaced

References

Populated places in Uganda